Hazrat Shah (born 10 March 1995) is a Pakistani first-class cricketer who plays for Hyderabad.

References

External links
 

1995 births
Living people
Pakistani cricketers
Hyderabad (Pakistan) cricketers
People from Upper Dir District